Alvin Jay Paris (October 17, 1918 – September 11, 2006), later known as Alvin Jay Paley, was an American bookmaker and gambler in New York. As a "front man" for a gambling syndicate based in Elizabeth, New Jersey, he fixed college sporting events through bribing star athletes, including Rocky Marciano.

Paris was born on October 17, 1918 in The Bronx, New York. During World War II, he served in the armed forces from 1940. 

After being recorded on federal wiretaps on December 15, 1946, in an investigation by Manhattan District Attorney Frank S. Hogan, a former assistant to crusading New York District Attorney Thomas Dewey, he was convicted of attempting to bribe professional football players Merle Hapes and Frank Filchock of the New York Giants with $2,500 each to throw that year's NFL championship game against the Chicago Bears. Paris was eventually convicted of bribery on January 8, 1947, and, although Hapes and Filchock were cleared of bribery charges, both men were initially suspended by then league commissioner Bert Bell (with Filchock being allowed to play the final game against the Chicago Bears).

During his trial, Paris chose not to take the stand in his own defense and later testified against his partners David Krakauer, Jerome Zarowitz and Harvey Stemmer, for which he would later receive death threats. Paris's sentencing had been deferred until after the second trial and he received a one-year sentence on April 7. He served less than a year before his release.

Paris married Norah Mae Gagnon King in Orange, California in 1950. By 1977, Paris had changed his name to Alvin J. Paley. Norah died in San Joaquin, California on January 8, 1994, at the age of 75. Alvin Paley died on September 11, 2006, at the age of 87.

References

Further reading
Cook, William E. Pete Rose: Baseball's All-Time Hit King. Jefferson, North Carolina: McFarland & Company, 2003. 
Moldea, Dan E. Interference: How Organized Crime Influences Professional Football. New York: William Morrow, 1989.
Sammons, Jeffrey Thomas. Beyond the Ring: the role of boxing in American society. University of Illinois Press. 1990. 
Smith, John L. Running Scared: the life and treacherous times of Las Vegas casino king Steve Wynn. New York: Thundermouth Press, 2003. 

1918 births
2006 deaths
American gamblers
American military personnel of World War II
Bookmakers
Match fixers